ZFP28 zinc finger protein is a protein that in humans is encoded by the ZFP28 gene.

References

Further reading

External links 
 PDBe-KB provides an overview of all the structure information available in the PDB for Human Zinc finger protein 28 homolog

Human proteins